The Christmas Miracle of Jonathan Toomey is a 2007 British film scripted and directed by Bill Clark. It was adapted from a 1995 book of the same name, written by Susan Wojciechowski and illustrated by P. J. Lynch, from which the film was adapted.

Film
The 91-minute film directed by Bill Clark starred Tom Berenger, Joely Richardson, Saoirse Ronan and Luke Ward-Wilkinson. Among other players were Benjamin Eli, Jack Montgomery and Jenny O'Hara. It played at eight film festivals including the Gloria Film Festival at Salt Lake City where it was named "Best Film – 2007". It was released on DVD in the US later that year, in the UK and the Netherlands 2008, and in Germany 2011. In December 2015 it received its national UK TV premier on C5.

Book
The 32-page children's picture book was written by Susan Wojciechowski, illustrated by P. J. Lynch, and published by Walker Books in 1995. One newspaper called it "the story of a gloomy woodcutter who gradually recovers his ability to find joy in life" and reported sales in the United States exceeding one million copies. For his part in that collaboration, Lynch won the annual Kate Greenaway Medal from the Library Association, recognising the year's best children's book illustration by a British subject. According to the retrospective citation, woodcarver Toomey accepts the job of creating nativity figurines for a widow and her son, and thereby resolves long-held grief for his own wife and child.

Walker's American division Candlewick Press published a U.S. edition within the calendar year (Library of Congress Classification PZ7.W8183 Ch 1995).

See also 
 List of Christmas films

References

External links 
 
  —immediately, first edition 

British Christmas films
British picture books
Kate Greenaway Medal winning works
1995 children's books
2007 films
2000s English-language films